Barbara Ambas Forteza (born July 31, 1997), professionally known as Barbie Forteza, is a Filipino actress, comedian, dancer, singer, host, and vlogger. She is the recipient of several accolades, including both international and local awards.

Early life
Barbara Ambas Forteza was born on July 31, 1997, in Biñan, Laguna, to Imelda and Tony Forteza. She has a sister, Gabrielle Vierneza.

Career

She is known for her roles such as young Jodi in GMA Network's remake of the 2003 South Korean television drama series, Stairway to Heaven and Cyndi Gomez in First Time. Forteza also appeared in several movies such as: Tween Academy: Class of 2012, The Road and the indie film, Puntod in which she won as New Movie Actress of the Year in the 26th PMPC Star Awards for Movies. In April 2013, Forteza released her self-titled album, Barbie Forteza under MCA Records with the carrier single, Meron Ba which was used as the theme song for GMA Network's Koreanovela, Big.

In 2014, Forteza was chosen to play one of the lead roles in the television series, The Half Sisters, alongside Thea Tolentino.

In August 2014, she won the Best Supporting Actress award in the new breed category at the 10th Cinemalaya Independent Film Festival, for the film Mariquina, portraying a teenage version of Mylene Dizon's character Imelda.

In 2016, she won the Best Actress Award in 36th Fantasporto International Film Festival when she portrayed a sea gypsy for the indie film, Laut. The film was also shown in the Pune International Film Festival.

Filmography

Television series

Television variety shows

Television comedy shows

Television anthologies

Film

Discography

Albums

Awards and recognition

References

External links
 
 https://www.gmanetwork.com/sparkle/artists/barbieforteza

1997 births
Living people
People from Biñan
Actresses from Laguna (province)
Tagalog people
Filipino child actresses
Filipino women comedians
GMA Network personalities
MCA Music Inc. (Philippines) artists
Filipino film actresses
Filipino television actresses
Filipino television variety show hosts